Sestao is a station on line 2 of the Bilbao metro. It is located in central Sestao, in close proximity to the city hall and the Santa María church. It opened on 8 January 2005 and it acted as northern terminus for line 2 until the opening of the Portugalete extension in 2007.

There is a station on the Cercanías Bilbao commuter railway network with the same name, but the two stations are not connected.

Station layout 

Sestao station follows the typical cavern-shaped layout of most underground Metro Bilbao stations designed by Norman Foster, with the main hall located directly above the rail tracks.

Access 

  Kasko Plaza, city hall (Kasko exit)
  14, Gran Vía de José Antonio Agirre y Lekube (La Salle exit, closed during night time services)
   Camino Txikito Rd. / Doctor Fleming St. (Camino Txikito Bidea exit, closed during night time services)
   2, Gran Vía de José Antonio Agirre y Lekube (Kasko exit)

Services 
The station is served by line 2 from Basauri to Kabiezes. The station is also served by Bizkaibus regional bus services.

References

External links
 

Line 2 (Bilbao metro) stations
Railway stations in Spain opened in 2005
2005 establishments in the Basque Country (autonomous community)